Ludmannsdorf (Slovene: Bilčovs) is a town in the district of Klagenfurt-Land in the Austrian state of Carinthia.

Geography
It is located on the left bank of the Drava river.

Population
According to the 2001 census, 28.3% of the population are Carinthian Slovenes.
In the Carinthian Plebiscite of 1920, Sankt Jakob was one of the 17 Carinthian municipalities, where the majority of the population (79%) voted for the annexation to the Kingdom of Serbs, Croats and Slovenes (Yugoslavia).

References

Cities and towns in Klagenfurt-Land District